"Subarashikikana, Kono Sekai -What A Wonderful World-" is a single released by Miyavi on November 14, 2007. The single contains three tracks on the regular edition, while the two limited editions will contain only two tracks, omitting "Mata Yume de Aimashou". The limited editions include a bonus DVD or photo book. It charted 13th on Oricon.

Track listing

Personnel 
 Miyavi – vocals, guitar, producer
 Tyko – MC, rapping
 Saro – tap dancing
 DJ 1, 2 – turntable
 Masahide Sakuma – bass guitar, producer
 Soul Toul – drums
 Tom Durack – mastering
 Noriyuki Kisou – recording, mixing

References 

2007 singles
Miyavi songs
2007 songs